Elia Suleiman (born 28 July 1960) is an Israeli-Palestinian film director and actor of Rûm Greek Orthodox origin. He is best known for the 2002 film Divine Intervention, a modern tragicomedy on living under occupation in Palestine which won the Jury Prize at the 2002 Cannes Film Festival. Suleiman's cinematic style is often compared to that of Jacques Tati and Buster Keaton, for its poetic interplay between "burlesque and sobriety". He is married to Lebanese singer and actress Yasmine Hamdan.

Life and career

Early work
Between 1982–1993, Suleiman lived in New York City, where he co-directed: Introduction to the End of an Argument (1990) and directed Homage by Assassination, that both won numerous awards.

An experimental video film, co-directed by Jayce Salloum, Introduction to the End of an Argument critiqued the portrayal of Arabs in Western media and its effect on foreign policy by juxtaposing clips from Hollywood films, television broadcasts and cartoons with live scenes (shot by Salloum) from the West Bank, and the Gaza Strip.

Homage by Assassination is a "diary film" that critiques the 1991 Gulf War via the juxtaposition of multilayered personal anecdotes and identity. The film offers a lucid portrait of what Ella Shohat and Robert Stam have termed "cultural disembodiment," manifested in "multiple failures of communication," that reflect the contradictions of a "diasporic subject."

Pedagogical work
In 1994, Suleiman moved to Jerusalem and began teaching at Birzeit University in the West Bank. He was entrusted with the task of developing a Film and Media Department at the university with funding support from the European Commission. In 2008 Elia Suleiman became a professor at the European Graduate School in Saas-Fee. He continues to guest lecture in other universities around the world.

Feature films
In 1996, Suleiman directed Chronicle of a Disappearance, his first feature film. It won the Best First Film Prize at the 1996 Venice Film Festival.

In 2002, Suleiman's second feature film, Divine Intervention, subtitled, A Chronicle of Love and Pain, won the Jury Prize at the 2002 Cannes Film Festival and the International Critics Prize  (FIPRESCI), also receiving the Best Foreign Film Prize at the European Awards in Rome.

The third film in his trilogy is called The Time That Remains, which competed in the 2009 Cannes Film Festival. Suleiman won the Black Pearl prize for best Middle Eastern narrative film at the Middle Eastern Film Festival in Abu Dhabi on 17 October 2009. The film won the Critics' Prize from the Argentinean Film Critics Association at Mar del Plata International Film Festival.

His latest film, It Must Be Heaven, competed in the 2019 Cannes Film Festival and had its North American premiere at the 2019 Toronto International Film Festival.

Other film work
In his 1998 film, The Arab Dream ("Al Hilm Al-Arabi") Suleiman autobiographically explores issues of identity, expressing that: "I don't have a homeland to say I live in exile... I live in postmortem... daily life, daily death." Suleiman also produced a short film in 1997, entitled War and Peace in Vesoul.

In 2000, Suleiman released the 15-minute short film "Cyber Palestine" which follows a modern-day Mary and Joseph as they attempt to cross from Gaza into Bethlehem. Suleiman was part of the nine person jury for the 2006 Cannes Film Festival.

Filmography

Feature films
Chronicle of a Disappearance (1996)
Divine Intervention (2002)
The Time That Remains (2009)
It Must Be Heaven (2019)

Short films
"Homage by Assassination" (1993), The Gulf War... What Next?
"The Arab Dream" (1998)
"Cyber Palestine" (2000)
"Awkward" (2007), To Each His Own Cinema
"Diary of a Beginner" (2012), 7 Days in Havana

Documentary films
Introduction to the End of an Argument (1990) (Co-directed by Jayce Salloum)

See also
Palestinian Christians

Notes

Further reading
Tanya Shilina-Conte, "Imaginal Border Crossings and Silence as Negative Mimesis in Elia Suleiman's Divine Intervention." In Border Visions: Identity and Diaspora in Film, edited by Jakub Kazecki, Karen A. Ritzenhoff, Cynthia J. Miller. Scarecrow Press, 2013, p. 3-21, .
Gertz, Nurith; Khleifi, George  (2008): Palestinian Cinema: Landscape, Trauma, and Memory, Indiana University Press. . Chapter 7: Between exile and Homeland: The Films of Elia Suleiman (p. 171 -189)

External links
Elia Suleiman @ European Graduate School. Biography, bibliography, photos and videos.

1960 births
Living people
Arab-Israeli film directors
Arab screenwriters
Israeli film directors
Israeli male film actors
Palestinian film directors
Palestinian male actors
People from Nazareth
Palestinian screenwriters
Palestinian film producers
Eastern Orthodox Christians from Palestine
European Film Awards winners (people)
Academic staff of European Graduate School
Birzeit University alumni
Israeli people of Greek descent